GP1 (previously branded as Kreator TV) is a European sports media platform specialized in motorsports. GP1 includes a TV network in local languages in Croatia, Slovenia, and several other countries, motorsport news portals, and a TV production specializing in a live production of the motorsports races from major European racetracks (Hungaroring, Valencia, Brands Hatch...). It broadcasts its program to all major IPTV & cable operators in Croatia, Slovenia, and Bosnia & Herzegovina. GP1's studios and broadcast facilities are located in Jastrebarsko, Croatia and Ljubljana, Slovenia.

GP1 first started in 2011. under the name Kreator F1 and Kreator F1 HD for broadcasting only Formula 1 in biggest Croatian provider Max TV - part of Croatian Telecom as Kreator's owner acquired exclusive Formula 1 media rights for Croatia. The name Kreator TV was used from the second half of 2013 after Formula 1 co-operation until 2022 when media group changes its name to GP1.

GP1 has a history with premium sports rights and they owned and broadcast such rights as Formula 1, MotoGP, MX GP, FIA WTCC, FIA ERC and others. Among the others GP1 produced the season 2015 of the Second Croatian Football league. Journalists from the GP1 made some exclusive interviews with the top sportsman like Lewis Hamilton, Nico Rosberg (one of the last interviews before retirement), Valentino Rossi, Ken Block and others.

GP1 made significant steps in 2020. with own, multi-camera live broadcasts of the ESET Cup Series races from Hungaroring, Slovakia Ring, Automotodrom Brno and Automotodrom Grobnik and at the end of the year NASCAR Whelen Euro Series from Grobnik (Croatia) and finals on the Circuit Ricardo Tormo Valencia (Spain).

In the 2021. they broadcast full NASCAR Euro season and ESET Cup doing TV production from Brands Hatch, Vallelunga, Valencia, Hungaroring, Slovakia Ring, Brno, Most, Grobnik, Poznan and other race tracks. New 15 camera Mercedes-Benz OB van was acquired at the end of the year. 

On 1 April 2022, GP1 name was selected, and new visual identity was used. First major broadcast was from Hungaroring beginning April 1, and this season is fully booked with live broadcasts from more than 13 European tracks.

References

External links
 

Sports television networks
Television channels in Croatia
Television channels and stations established in 2011